Kenneth Christiansen may refer to:
 Kenneth Christiansen (D. B. Cooper suspect)
 Kenneth A. Christiansen, American speleobiologist and Collembola systematist (in Russian)
 Kenneth Heiner Christiansen, Danish footballer